Newtown or Newtown Cross is a village in County Laois, Ireland. It is within the townlands of Clonbrock (Cluain Broc) and Doonane (Dúnán).

Newtown lies close to the border between Counties Laois and Kilkenny at the point where the R430 regional road from Abbeyleix to Carlow crosses the N78 from Kilkenny to Athy. As of the 2016 census, the village had a population of 269 people.

The local Gaelic Athletic Association club, Crettyard, has its grounds and clubhouse at Newtown Cross.

See also
List of towns and villages in Ireland

References

Towns and villages in County Laois
Townlands of County Laois